The Evangelische Michaelsbruderschaft (EMB) (Evangelical Brotherhood of St. Michael) is a German religious Brotherhood belonging to Berneuchen Movement as a part of Lutheran Liturgical Movement.

Founded in Michaelmas 1931 in the Upper Chapel (Holy Cross Chapel) of the University Church of Marburg, the Michaelsbruderschaft consists of men, lay and clergy, following a rule of life. The trias martyria (effective witness for Christ), leiturgia (renewal of personal and corporate piety and of sacramental worship), and diakonia (service in society) was first developed within the Michaelsbruderschaft. Members try to put these aims into practice in their individual communities.

The Brotherhood is led by the Ältester (Eldest) who is assisted by the Rat (council) and Kapitel (chapter). The Ältester of the Brotherhood today is Helmut Schwerdtfeger.

Today the Michaelsbruderschaft consists of about 250 Brothers from the whole of Central Europe. Brethren are mostly Lutheran, but also from Reformed and Union Churches, Methodist, Old Catholic, Christian Catholic and Roman Catholic Churches. Today there are Brethren in Germany, Austria, Hungary, France, Switzerland, Poland, Romania and Iceland.

The Michaelsbruderschaft has got its own breviary for its daily office, the Evangelisches Tagzeitenbuch, and its own missal, Die Feier der Evangelischen Messe (2009).

References
Swidler, Leonard J.: The Ecumenical Vanguard: The History of the Una Sancta Movement
Universitätskirche Marburg - Die evangelische Michaelsbruderschaft 
50 Jahre Michaelsbruderschaft by Jürgen Boeckh. Quatember 1981 (p. 239-240)
 Giewald, A. & Thomann, G. "The Lutheran High Church Movement in Germany and its liturgical work: an introduction", Lulu.com, 2011.

External links
Evangelische Michaelsbruderschaft

Lutheran orders and societies
Christian organizations established in 1931
Christian religious orders established in the 20th century
Lutheran organizations established in the 20th century
Protestantism in Germany